Porag (Assamese: পৰাগ) is a five-day long post-harvest festival observed by the Misings of Assam. Drummers and dancers belonging to a village are invited to perform in the neighboring village. They present their skills to their full potential, providing wholesome entertainment to those gathered at the venue. It is a festival of songs and dances. It is also called Nara Singha Bihu.

Significance
Generally Miri youths, after harvesting the crops, observe this festival in order to appease the Almighty, mother earth and their forefathers and seek blessings from them. Both young boys and girls in their traditional attire take part in singing and dancing. The songs are based on agriculture and the dances are typical imitation of the dance postures of the agricultural works.

The Muroung
The Murong is the community hall of the Misings. At the beginning of the festival the Morung is renovated decorating the tie- beams and the posts splendidly. Nowadays, in some villages, the system of decorating them has changed and a new one is used.

Arrangement
The youth organisation of the tribe arranges the festival in a formal and systematic manner called Daghik. For smooth functioning of the festival, officers are appointed as Migam Bora and Bar Puwary etc. under whom there are some high and low officers as Deka Bora, Tiri Bora, Tamuli and Bar Barani who assist them to run function well. In ancient time a Miboo was appointed as leader for the functioning of the festival. Nowadays he has been replaced by Migam Bora and Bar puwary.

The feast
A grand feast is arranged where at least four to five pigs are sacrificed. Large quantities of food stuffs and drink are arranged much in advance. The host village invites neighboring villages to take part in the festival as Minams (guests). The Minams are cordially received and taken with Gumrag dance to the Morung. The festival ends with a prayer dance known as Ponu Nunam.

See also
Assamese Culture

References

Festivals in Assam
Harvest festivals in India
Mising people